The 2009 Nova Scotia Scotties Tournament of Hearts, Nova Scotia's women's provincial curling championship, was held January 20-25 at the Bridgewater Curling Club in Bridgewater. The winner represented Nova Scotia at the 2009 Scotties Tournament of Hearts in Victoria, British Columbia.

Teams

Standings

Results

January 21
McConnery 11-7 Nix
Mouzar 7-3 Cutcliffe
Pinkney 10-6 Rhyno
Arseneault 7-6 Mattatall 
Rhyno 11-2 Mouzar 
Arsenault 7-5 Nix
Mattatall 7-3 McConnery
Pinkney 9-3 Cutcliffe

January 22
Nix 6-5 Pinkney
Rhyno 8-6 Arsenault
McConnery 11-7 Cutcliffe
Mouzar 5-2 Mattatall
Cutcliffe 5-4 Mattatall 
McConnery 6-3 Mouzar
Arsenault 8-4 Pinkney 
Nix 7-3 Rhyno

January 23
Arsenault 8-3 McConnery
Cutcliffe 6-5 Rhyno
Nix 10-6 Mattatall
Mouzar 9-2 Pinkney 
Rhyno 8-7 Mattatall
Pinkney 9-5 McConnery
Arsneault 7-2 Mouzar
Nix 6-5 Cutcliffe

January 24
Arsenault 9-3 Cutcliffe 
Mattatall 8-7 Pinkney
Mouzar 13-9 Nix
McConnery 6-5 Rhyno

Tie breaker
Mouzar 7-6 Nix

Playoffs
All games January 25

Semi-final

Final

Nova Scotia
2009 in Canadian curling
Bridgewater, Nova Scotia